Wakahirume is a goddess of the rising sun in Japanese mythology. She is the daughter or younger sister of Amaterasu. Some interpretations view her as the personification of the morning sun.

She was involved in making garments for the kami. In some versions Wakahirume was killed when Susanoo threw a flayed pony at her while she was in Amaterasu's weaving hall.

References 

Japanese goddesses
Solar goddesses
Amatsukami